Rebecca Kukiriza, commonly known as Chosen Becky, is a Ugandan singer,  musician and songwriter.

Music career
Chosen Becky was discovered by Joseph Kiwangwa after she impressed him at a singing competition in Masaka, Uganda. Becky started her music career in 2017 coming up with "Bankuuza" as her first song.

Discography 
{| class="wikitable"
|+songs
!song Title
!Year
|-
|Aliba Ani
|2018
|-
|Bya Bangi
|2018
|-
|Kyosaba
|2019
|-
|Bankuzza
|2019
|-
|Ebisembayo
|2019
|-
|Telemundo
|2019
|-
|Bankuzza
|2019
|-
|Kansubire
|2019

Education
Becky was born in Masaka the Central Region of Uganda. She attended several educational institutions, including Masaka S.S.S for O-level and A-level at St Anthony SS Kayunga in 2016.

Controversies
In November 2021, Chosen was deported from South Africa where she was scheduled to perform because she had arrived in the country on a tourist visa and not on a work visa as required.

References

External references
Chosen Becky Music, Songs, Videos, Mp3 Downloads and Biography
Why Singer Chosen Becky was Deported from South Africa
Chosen Becky and Voltage Music express 'Telemundo' love | VIDEO
Chosen Becky to Face Court for not Performing at an Introduction after Being Paid Shs 2M
PHOTOS: Jose Chameleone, Chosen Becky shut down Masaka at the Johnnie Walker Highball Tour
‘Bankuza’ single making Chosen Becky a star | Showbizuganda

People from Masaka District
Living people
People from Kampala District
Ganda people
Ugandan singer-songwriters
21st-century Ugandan singers
2000 births